Robinstown may refer to the following places:

 Robinstown (Levinge), a townland in Mullingar, County Westmeath, Ireland
 Robinstown (Tyrrell), a townland in Mullingar, County Westmeath, Ireland
 Robinstown, Carrick, a townland in County Westmeath, Ireland
 Robinstown, County Meath, a village and townland in County Meath, Ireland

See also
 Robins Township, Fall River County, South Dakota